Return to Glennascaul, also known as Orson Welles' Ghost Story, is a 1951 short film starring Orson Welles. It was written and directed by Hilton Edwards, produced by Micheál Mac Liammóir for Dublin Gate Theatre Productions and distributed by Arthur Mayer.

The plot is derived from the ubiquitous story of the vanishing hitchhiker. It is similar to Lucille Fletcher's original radio play, The Hitch-Hiker, which was first performed in 1941 on The Orson Welles Show starring Welles as the spooked driver.

Plot summary
Welles, plays himself taking a break from the filming of Othello, is driving in the Irish countryside one night when he offers a ride to a man (played by Michael Laurence) with car trouble. The man relates a strange event that happened to him at the same location. Two women flagged down, asking for a ride to their manor. They invited him in for a drink. The daughter, Lucy Campbell (played by Helena Hughes), was apparently the long lost love of the man's uncle by the inscription read in the cigarette case she admired. {Her first name is not revealed until the end of the story.} After leaving, he went back for his cigarette case but found the manor deserted and decayed. In Dublin, a real estate broker (played by John Dunne) told him the mother (played by Shelah Richards) and daughter had died years ago. The Broker gives him a set of keys to the manor so he can see if his cigarette case is there. Upon arrival, he hears voices and sees his footprints in the dust on the floor. On the fireplace mantle is the cigarette case and as he hears the clock chimes he flees from the house as Lucy cries, "don't go".  Having finished his tale, he shows Welles the cigarette case, who is now sufficiently spooked,  and drops the man off at his home. He leaves in a hurry when the man asks him in for a cup of tea or something stronger as the ghostly women had earlier invited him into Glennascaul. As Welles drives off he passes two flesh, and blood women (played by Isobel Couser and Ann Clery) who wave for a ride, who recognize the actor and he tries to hide his face as he drives past.

Awards
The film was nominated for an Oscar for Best Short Subject.

Releases
This film is only 23 minutes long and is an extra on the recently released reissued DVD of Welles' Othello. It was also released as Orson Welles' Ghost Story.

References

External links
 

1951 films
Irish black-and-white films
Irish short films
Films based on urban legends
1951 short films
1950s English-language films